Interpretation of dreams may refer to:
Dream interpretation, the process of assigning meaning to dreams
Oneiromancy, a form of divination based upon dreams
Interpretation of Dreams (Antiphon), a classical work by Antiphon, surviving only in fragments
Oneirocritica (Greek for "The Interpretation of Dreams"), a classical work by Artemidorus
The Interpretation of Dreams, Sigmund Freud's 1899 book about psychoanalysis and dreams
Interpretation of Dreams (film), 1990 documentary film released by Andrei Zagdansky

See also
Book of Dreams (disambiguation)